Hugh Webster (August 30, 1927 – May 31, 1986) was a Scottish-born Canadian actor. He was most noted for his role in the film For Gentlemen Only, for which he and his costar Ed McNamara were joint winners of the Canadian Film Award for Best Actor in a Non-Feature at the 27th Canadian Film Awards in 1976.

Biography
Born in Edinburgh, Webster moved to Canada as a teenager, and studied drama in Toronto. He became one of the early stars of Canadian television, notably appearing as a regular cast member in Sunshine Sketches and in many episodes of CBC Television drama anthologies. He was also a frequent stage performer, both at the Stratford Festival, most notably playing The Fool in a 1964 production of King Lear, and in the Toronto theatre scene, where he won a Dora Mavor Moore Award for Best Featured Male Performance in 1983 for his role in Toronto Free Theatre's production of Brian Friel's Translations.

Personal life
He married Canadian-born actress Jan Campbell in October 1952.

Filmography

References

External links

1927 births
1986 deaths
20th-century Canadian male actors
20th-century Scottish male actors
Canadian male television actors
Canadian male film actors
Canadian male stage actors
Canadian Screen Award winners
Dora Mavor Moore Award winners
Male actors from Edinburgh
Male actors from Toronto
Scottish emigrants to Canada
Canadian male Shakespearean actors